The Women's Individual Class 5 table tennis competition at the 2008 Summer Paralympics was held between 7 September and 11 September at the Peking University Gymnasium.

Classes 1-5 were for athletes with a physical impairment that affected their legs, who competed in a sitting position. The lower the number, the greater the impact the impairment was on an athlete’s ability to compete.

The event was won by Ren Guixiang, representing .

Results

Preliminary round

Group A

Group B

Group C

Group D

Competition bracket

References

W
Para